Palena may refer to:

Places
In Chile:
Palena Province
Palena, Chile

In Italy:
Palena, Abruzzo, the namesake of the Chilean town and province

People
 Claudia M. Palena, Argentine-American immunologist and cancer researcher
 Nicola da Forca Palena (1349-1449), Italian Roman Catholic priest